The Digital Watermarking Alliance is a group of like-minded companies that share a common interest in furthering the adoption of digital watermarking.  The mission of the Digital Watermarking Alliance is:

 "to create awareness and promote the value of digital watermarking to content owners, industry, policy makers, and consumers."

Founding members 
The Digital Watermarking Alliance is made up of 12 companies that all have an established presence in the digital watermarking technology and solutions market.  Member companies include:

 Cinea
 Digimarc
 GCS Research
 Jura
 MediaGrid
 Media Science International (MSI)
 Philips
 Signum
 Teletrax
 Thomson SA
 Cinavia [was Verance]
 Verimatrix, Inc.

Current members 
As of January 2018, the Digital Watermarking Alliance have 6 companies as its members.
 ContentArmor
 Irdeto
 MarkAny
 Media Science International (MSI)
 NexGuard
 Verimatrix

See also
 Digital watermarking
 Watermark
 Watermark detection
 Watermark (data file)
 Copy attack
 Copy protection

References

External links
 

Digital watermarking
Computer graphics organizations